The seventh season of Homicide: Life on the Street aired in the United States on the NBC television network from September 25, 1998 to May 21, 1999 and contained 22 episodes. 

The seventh season marked the debut of characters FBI Agent Mike Giardello (Giancarlo Esposito) and Detective Rene Sheppard (Michael Michele).  Recurring character Detective Terri Stivers (Toni Lewis) became a regular cast member as of season 7, while Chief Medical Examiner George Griscom (Austin Pendleton) becomes a recurring character following the season 6 departure of C.M.E.  Julianna Cox.

The DVD box set of season 7 was released for Region 1 on June 28, 2005. The set includes all 22 season 7 episodes on six discs.

During the sixth season, NBC considered canceling the show in the face of consistently low ratings, but a number of shocks at NBC increased Homicide's value. Among those factors were the loss of the popular series Seinfeld and the $850 million deal needed to keep ER from leaving the network. As a result, the network approved a 22-episode seventh season.

Episodes
When first shown on network television, multiple episodes towards the end of season were aired out of order. The DVD present the episodes in the correct chronological order, restoring all storylines and character developments.

References

External links
 
 
 

 
1998 American television seasons
1999 American television seasons